Ignacio Javier Hasbún Delgado (born 2 January 1990) was a Chilean footballer 

His last club was Magallanes, where he played from 2010–2015.

Honours

Club
Magallanes
Tercera División de Chile (1): 2010

External links
 Profile at BDFA
 

1990 births
Living people
Chilean footballers
Chilean people of Palestinian descent
Magallanes footballers
Deportes Copiapó footballers
Club Deportivo Universidad Católica footballers
Chilean Primera División players
Primera B de Chile players
Association football goalkeepers